is a 2016 action role-playing game developed by FromSoftware and published by Bandai Namco Entertainment for PlayStation 4, Xbox One, and Windows. The third and final entry in the Dark Souls series, it is played in a third-person perspective, and players have access to various weapons, armour, magic, and consumables that they can use to fight their enemies. Hidetaka Miyazaki, the creator of the series, returned to direct the game after handing the development duties of Dark Souls II to others.

Dark Souls III was critically and commercially successful, with critics calling it a worthy and fitting conclusion to the series. It shipped over three million copies within its first two months and over 10 million by 2020. Two downloadable content (DLC) expansions, Ashes of Ariandel and The Ringed City, were also made. Dark Souls III: The Fire Fades Edition, containing the base game and both expansions, was released in April 2017.

Gameplay 

Dark Souls III is an action role-playing game played in a third-person perspective. According to lead director and series creator Hidetaka Miyazaki, the game's gameplay design followed "closely from Dark Souls II". Players are equipped with various weapons to fight against enemies, such as bows, throwable projectiles, and swords. Shields can act as secondary weapons, but they are mainly used to deflect enemies' attacks and protect the player from suffering damage. Each weapon has two basic types of attack, one being a standard attack and the other being slightly more powerful that can be charged up, similar to FromSoftware's previous game, Bloodborne. In addition, attacks can be evaded through dodge-rolling. Bonfires, which serve as checkpoints, return from previous instalments. Ashes, according to Miyazaki, play an important role in the game.
Magic is featured in the game, with a returning magic system from Demon's Souls, now known as "focus points" (FP). When performing spells, the player's focus points are consumed. There are two types of Estus Flasks in the game, which can be allotted to fit a player's particular play style. One refills hit points like previous games in the series, while the other refills focus points, a feature new to the game. Combat and movements were made faster and more fluid than in Dark Souls II. Several player movements are performed more rapidly, allowing more damage to be done in a shorter period.

Players encounter different enemies throughout the game, each with different behaviours. Some of them change their combat pattern during battles. New combat features are introduced in Dark Souls III, including weapon and shield "Skills", which are special abilities that vary from weapon to weapon and enable special attacks and features at the cost of focus points. The game focuses more on role-playing; the expanded character builder and improved weapons provide more tactical options. The game features fewer overall maps than its predecessor Dark Souls II, but they are larger and more detailed, encouraging exploration. The adaptability stat from Dark Souls II was removed in Dark Souls III, with other stats being adjusted alongside the introduction of the luck stat. The game features multiplayer elements like the previous games in the series.

Plot 
Set in the Kingdom of Lothric, a bell has rung to signal that the First Flame, responsible for maintaining the Age of Fire, is dying out. As has happened many times before, the coming of the Age of Dark produces the undead: cursed beings that rise after death. The Age of Fire can be prolonged by linking the fire, a ritual in which great lords and heroes sacrifice their souls to rekindle the First Flame. However, Prince Lothric, the chosen linker for this age, abandoned his duty and chose to watch the flame die from afar. The bell is the last hope for the Age of Fire, resurrecting previous Lords of Cinder (heroes who linked the flame in past ages) to attempt to link the fire again; however, all but one Lord shirk their duty. Meanwhile, Sulyvahn, a sorcerer from the Painted World of Ariandel, wrongfully proclaims himself Pontiff and seizes power over Irithyll of the Boreal Valley and the returning Anor Londo cathedral from Dark Souls as a tyrant.

The Ashen One, an Undead who failed to become a Lord of Cinder and thus called an Unkindled, rises and must link the fire by returning Prince Lothric and the defiant Lords of Cinder to their thrones in Firelink Shrine. The Lords include the Abyss Watchers, a legion of warriors sworn by the Old Wolf's Blood which linked their souls into one to protect the land from the Abyss and ultimately locked in an endless battle between each other; Yhorm the Giant, who sacrificed his life for a nation conquered by his ancestor; and Aldrich, who became a Lord of Cinder despite his ravenous appetite for both men and gods. Lothric himself was raised to link the First Flame but shirked his duties and chose instead to watch the fire fade.

Once the Ashen One succeeds in returning Lothric and the Lords of Cinder to their thrones, they travel to the ruins of the Kiln of the First Flame. There, they encounter the Soul of Cinder, an amalgamation of all the previous Lords of Cinder who had linked the flame in the past. Once the Soul of Cinder is defeated, four endings are made possible based on the player's actions during the game. The player can attempt to link the fire, summon the Fire Keeper to extinguish the flame and begin an age of Dark, or kill her. A fourth ending consists of the Ashen One taking the flame for their own and becoming the Lord of Hollows.

Ashes of Ariandel 
Ashes of Ariandel introduces a new area, the Painted World of Ariandel. On arriving at the Cathedral of the Deep in the base game, the Ashen One meets a wandering knight, Gael, who implores them to enter the Painted World and fulfil a prophecy to bring "Fire for Ariandel." Inhabitants of this world variously beg the Ashen One to burn the Painted World per the prophecy or leave it to its slow rot. A painter girl tells the Ashen One of "Uncle Gael"'s promise to find her dyes to paint a new world. The player's decision to proceed elicits first coldness from the world's self-appointed guardian and then a boss fight, in which Ariandel is ultimately set on fire. The painter thanks the player for showing her flame and awaits Gael for the Dark Soul, which she can use to paint a new world for humanity.

In keeping with previous franchise DLC, Ashes of Ariandel introduces a substantial new area, two boss fights and several new weapons, spells, and armour pieces.

The Ringed City 

In The Ringed City, the Ashen One begins their journey to an area known as "The Dreg Heap", where ruined kingdoms of different eras are piled upon each other as the world draws to a close. From the Dreg Heap, after battling through the ruins of Lothric Castle, the Ashen One encounters the amnesiac knight Lapp, who cannot remember his past. Throughout the Dreg Heap, messages from Gael from Ashes of Ariandel guide the player. The Ashen One traverses the remnants of Earthen Peak, an area encountered in Dark Souls II, before fighting the last remnant of the demon race, the Demon Prince, in the base of an Archtree that contains the ruins of Firelink Shrine from Dark Souls. Victorious, the player travels to the Ringed City, an ancient city of Pygmies, the ancestors of humanity, which has fallen into the Abyss. After defeating the guardian of the Church of Filianore, the player awakens Filianore, the daughter of Lord Gwyn, who was entrusted to the Ringed City as a token of peace between Gwyn and the Pygmy Lords. This transports them to a ruined wasteland of ash, which can be interpreted as either a skip forward in time or the lifting of an illusion cast by Filianore. There, the Ashen One meets a dishevelled Gael, who has begun killing the Pygmy Lords to gain the blood of the Dark Soul from the Pygmies for the painter girl in Ariandel to use as ink. After consuming the Dark Soul, Gael has been fully corrupted by its power and demands the Ashen One's portion of it. He is finally struck down, allowing the Ashen One to obtain his blood (which contains the Dark Soul). The Ashen One then gives the Blood of the Dark Soul to the painter in Ariandel, who uses it to paint a new world for humanity.

Development 

The game's development began in mid-2013 before the release of Dark Souls II, whose development was handled by Tomohiro Shibuya and Yui Tanimura instead of the series creator, Hidetaka Miyazaki. The game was developed alongside Bloodborne but was handled by two mainly separate teams. Miyazaki also returned to direct Dark Souls III. Isamu Okano and Tanimura, the directors of Steel Battalion: Heavy Armor and Dark Souls II, respectively, served as sub-directors for the game. Despite Miyazaki initially believing that the series would not have many sequels, Miyazaki later added that the game would not be the last in the series. Instead, it would serve as a "turning point" for both the franchise and the studio, as it was the last project by FromSoftware before Miyazaki became the company's president. The game's gameplay was then first shown at Gamescom 2015 in August.

Miyazaki said that Bloodborne limitations made him want to return to the Dark Souls series. The game's level design was created to become more of another "enemy" the player must face. However, just as the former Souls games narrate their stories, Dark Souls III unfolds the plot with strong vagueness: players can learn the storyline merely through the conversation with non-player characters (NPCs), art design, and item flavour text. Due to this, Miyazaki states that there is no official and unique story. His intention in designing this game was to not impose his viewpoint, with him stating that any attempts to discover and understand the plot and that world are encouraged. The improvement to archery, specifically draw speed, was inspired by Legolas from The Lord of the Rings franchise. The game's visual design focuses on "withered beauty", with ember and ash scattered throughout the game's world. The game's original score was primarily written by Dark Souls II and Bloodborne composer Yuka Kitamura. Additional music was written by Dark Souls composer Motoi Sakuraba, with a single boss theme each by Tsukasa Saitoh and Nobuyoshi Suzuki.

Dark Souls III was released in Japan for PlayStation 4 and Xbox One on March 24, 2016, and released worldwide, along with the Windows version, on April 12, 2016. A stress test for the game, which allowed players selected by Bandai Namco to test the game's network functionality before release, was available for three days in October 2015. The game has three special editions for players to purchase, which cost more than the base game. Players who pre-ordered the game had their game automatically upgraded to the Apocalypse Edition, which has a special case and the game's original soundtrack. The Collector's Edition contains physical items such as the Red Knight figurine, an artbook, a new map, and special packaging. The Prestige Edition features all the content in The Collector's Edition but has an additional Lord of Cinder resin figurine, which can form a pair with the Red Knight figurine.

The game's first downloadable content (DLC) expansion, titled Ashes of Ariandel, was released on October 24, 2016. The second and final DLC, The Ringed City, was released on March 28, 2017. Both DLCs added new locations, bosses, armours, and weapons to the game. A complete version containing the base game and both DLCs, titled Dark Souls III: The Fire Fades Edition, was released on April 21, 2017.

Reception 

Dark Souls III received "generally favorable" reviews according to review aggregator Metacritic, with praise given to the game's visuals and combat mechanics, reminding reviewers of its faster-paced similarity to Bloodborne.

Chloi Rad of IGN awarded the game a 9.5 out of 10, stating she thought that "If Dark Souls 3 truly is the last in the series as we know it, then it's a worthy send-off." Rich Stanton of Eurogamer rated the game as "essential", calling it "fabulous" and that it was "a fitting conclusion" to the Dark Souls series. Steven Strom of Ars Technica wrote that he thought the title still had the "smooth and impressive rendering of the series' signature style" and some of "the best boss fights in any Souls game". Simon Parkin of The Guardian gave the game 5 out of 5 stars and wrote that while Dark Souls III "may not have the novelty of the first Dark Souls", it was "the more pristine and rounded work" of the series.

However, criticism was directed at issues with the game's technical performance, linear map design, and Bandai Namco's handling of the Western launch. Philip Kollar of Polygon rated the game a 7 out of 10, bluntly stating disappointment at the lack of surprises and the arbitrary nature of the game's design, writing that "in so many important ways -- its world design, its pacing, the technology powering it - Dark Souls III falls short of the mark." A later patch, released on April 9, fixed some of the technical issues reviewers had with the game.

Reception to Ashes of Ariandel, the game's first downloadable content (DLC) expansion, was generally positive. Brendan Graeber of IGN enjoyed what the DLC offered, enjoying the introduction of a dedicated player versus player (PvP) arena, as well as the new enemies and bosses, but criticised the length, stating that Ashes of Ariandel served more as "an appetizer than a full course meal". Kollar of Polygon considered the content of the DLC to be "great" but agreed with Graeber's criticism of the length, saying that there was not much of it.

Sales 
In Japan, the PlayStation 4 version sold over 200,000 copies in its first two weeks of release. It became the fastest-selling video game published by Bandai Namco Entertainment America, becoming its most successful day-one launch. It held the record for the fastest-selling Bandai Namco game up until it was surpassed by Elden Ring in 2022.

On May 10, 2016, Bandai Namco announced that Dark Souls III had reached three million copies shipped worldwide, with 500,000 in Japan and Asia, 1.5 million in North America, and one million in Europe. It was also reported that Dark Souls III was the best-selling software in North America in the month of release. By May 2020, the game had sold over 10 million copies.

Awards

Notes

References

External links 

 

2016 video games
Action role-playing video games
Bandai Namco games
Dark fantasy role-playing video games
Video games about death
FromSoftware games
Multiplayer and single-player video games
PlayStation 4 games
Role-playing video games
Video games scored by Motoi Sakuraba
Video games developed in Japan
Video game sequels
Video games featuring protagonists of selectable gender
Video games using Havok
Video games with alternate endings
Video games with downloadable content
Windows games
Xbox One games
PlayStation 4 Pro enhanced games
Video games directed by Hidetaka Miyazaki
Soulslike video games
Golden Joystick Award for Game of the Year winners
Dark Souls
D.I.C.E. Award for Role-Playing Game of the Year winners